The Skinner & Eddy Corporation, commonly known as Skinner & Eddy, was a Seattle, Washington-based shipbuilding corporation that existed from 1916 to 1923. The yard is notable for completing more ships for the United States war effort during World War I than any other West Coast shipyard, and also for breaking world production speed records for individual ship construction.

In total, the company built 75 ships—72 cargo ships and three oil tankers—from 1916 to 1920, including 32 completed for the Emergency Fleet Corporation during the war. The yard was closed in 1921 as a result of the severe postwar shipbuilding slump. Skinner & Eddy later became a shipping line operator, and appears to have been wound up in the early 1970s.

Background

The Skinner & Eddy Corporation was founded in January 1916 by two entrepreneurs, David E. "D.E." Skinner and John W. Eddy, owners of the Port Blakely Mill Company since 1903.

In 1916, William H. Todd was just beginning his career as a shipyard operator. Originally from Brooklyn, the Todd Corporation purchased the former Moran Shipyard some time in 1916.

On April 6, 1917, the United States entered World War I. Skinner & Eddy responded to the news by purchasing an additional  of Seattle waterfront property from the Seattle Dock Company and the Centennial Flouring Mill for $1,500,000 and $600,000 respectively, which they used to extend their yard. After securing lucrative contracts from the Emergency Fleet Corporation for the construction of merchant ships for the war effort, Skinner & Eddy was also able in June 1918 to make an outright purchase of the yard of Seattle Construction and Dry Dock, which was named Plant No. 2. Todd continued his Seattle operation on nearby Harbor Island and had also moved into Commencement Bay in 1917. In World War II these two yards would emerge as the largest facilities to produce for the war effort in Puget Sound under the name of Seattle-Tacoma Shipbuilding Corporation.

Facilities

When completed, Skinner & Eddy's facilities included ten building slipways—five at each Plant—and four outfitting docks. A five-section,  drydock capable of servicing vessels of up to 15,000 tons was also acquired, along with a 50-ton floating crane.

Most of the ships built by the company during the war were constructed at Plant No. 1, as Plant No. 2 was only acquired halfway through the period of activity.

World War I

The company's first contracts were secured in May 1916 for 4 cargo ships of 5,730 tons and 2 tankers of 6,400 tons (35,720t).

Construction of the yard began no earlier than February 1916, in May 1917 it had 3 slipways on 15 acres with a fourth of 600 ft. under construction and contract volume had risen to 7 cargo ships total for Nielsen and 3 tankers for Standard Oil of New jersey

Skinner & Eddy soon began to distinguish itself by its production speed. Prior to its operations, a cargo ship built and delivered in the United States in under 250 days was considered fast, but as early as June 1917, the company under the capable direction of its general manager, David Rodgers, completed a freighter, Stolt Nielson, in under 150 days. In November 1917, the company established a world keel-to-launch production speed record of under 70 days, maintaining and improving on the record over the following five months. In early 1918, another U.S. company briefly established a new world keel-to-launch record of 61 days, but Skinner & Eddy recaptured the record in April with the 55-day launch of West Lianga, a ship that was also completed in the record time of 80 days.

Thereafter, all the company's ships built during the war were each completed in well under 100 days, with a best performance by war's end of 79 days from keel laying to delivery. Good management alone was probably not entirely responsible for the company's outstanding performance however; Skinner & Eddy also paid its employees highly competitive wages, which enabled the company to attract the best and most skilled workers.

The company's improved performance over time is also reflected in its total production figures. In 1917, the company produced a total tonnage of 72,800 tons; the following year it raised production more than threefold, to 232,400 tons. In all, Skinner & Eddy delivered 32 ships to the EFT, including 29 freighters and three tankers, over the course of the war—more than that of any other shipyard in the country.

Postwar history

Since it was a widely held belief in the United States that a shipbuilding boom would follow the end of hostilities, the USSB declined to cancel many of its wartime shipbuilding contracts at the end of the war. In Skinner & Eddy's case, this meant that the company was to complete a further 43 ships for the USSB in the postwar period. In 1920 however, the USSB cancelled a contract for an additional 25 ships, prompting the company to launch a $17 million claim against the government for lost anticipated profits, later reduced to a $9 million claim.

Skinner & Eddy delivered its last ship in February 1920, but failed to secure any further shipbuilding contracts after this date because of the severe postwar shipbuilding slump. In 1923, the Skinner & Eddy shipyard was permanently closed, and the company's proprietors, D.E. Skinner and John Eddy, dissolved their longstanding business partnership. John Eddy returned to the lumber business, and Skinner became sole proprietor of the Skinner & Eddy Corporation, which retained its original name.

Skinner & Eddy now entered the shipping line business with the purchase of the Pacific Steamship Company, which operated from the company's former Plant No. 2. The company also invested heavily in Alaskan salmon canneries. In 1944, Skinner & Eddy bought the Alaska Steamship Company, and in the postwar period also operated a cruise line. D.E. Skinner's grandson, David E. "Ned" Skinner II, discontinued the business in 1971, moving the family assets into real estate. His Skinner Corporation would eventually become one of America's largest private companies.

The ships

Skinner & Eddy produced a total of 75 ships from 1916 to 1920 (the yard no. sequence ends at 76 as the number 13 was skipped). Most of the ships were freighters, but three 10,000-ton tankers were amongst the seven ships built for private contractors prior to the U.S. entry into World War I.

The company built three different types of standard freighters for the USSB, all of them of Skinner & Eddy's own design. The USSB designated these types as Design 1013, Design 1079 and Design 1105 respectively.

Some were also completed as oil fired and others as coal fired vessels. Skinner & Eddy built a total of 24 ships of this type. Most of the ships completed by the company during the war were of this type.

The Design 1079 was of 9,600 tons deadweight, turbine-powered and oil fired, with dimensions of 409.6 x 54.2 x . Skinner & Eddy was the only company which built this type. A total of 23 were completed. The Design 1105 was also 9,600 tons deadweight, oil-fired and with triple expansion engines. Dimensions were 401.5 x 54.8 x . Again, Skinner & Eddy was the only company which produced this type. A total of 14 were built.

Additionally, eleven 8,800 deadweight-ton freighters, similar if not identical to the Design 1013s were built prior to the manufacture of the USSB types listed above.

In service

Of the first 39 ships built by Skinner & Eddy during and shortly after World War I, 23 were immediately commissioned on completion into the U.S. Navy, and served briefly as supply ships before decommissioning in 1919. A further three were assigned Navy ID's but never commissioned.

All three of these vessels would remain in Navy service through the end of World War II.

Only one Skinner & Eddy ship was lost (to enemy action) in World War I. In the interwar period, most of the company's vessels were engaged in  commercial service. Three, Elkton and Nile were lost to maritime accidents in the 1920s, and seven more were scrapped in the 1930s, probably because of the oversupply of shipping.

World War II took a heavy toll of Allied merchant vessels, and of the 64 Skinner & Eddy ships that saw service in the war, 31, or almost 50%, were lost to enemy action, most of them to U-boats. Another two were deliberately sunk as breakwaters during the Normandy Campaign. The 31 that survived the war were mostly scrapped in the late 1940s and 1950s, and only four were still in existence by 1960. The last Skinner & Eddy vessel to see service was probably Edray, transferred to the Soviet Union under lend-lease during World War II and scrapped in 1967.

Fate of the shipyards

Following the closure of the Skinner & Eddy shipyards in 1923, the company's Plant No. 2 was sold in 1924 to the Pacific Steamship Company, which built a new office and terminus on the site. The site also became the terminus of the Admiral Line, which did considerable trade with Siberia and the Orient.

With the onset of the Great Depression in 1929, the site became a Hooverville for Seattle's unemployed. During World War II, the Hooverville was razed to make way for a huge supply depot run by the Army Quartermaster Corps, and after the war it became a base for the U.S. Coast Guard. As of 2003, the site was the location for several large container shipping terminals. Skinner & Eddy's Plant No. 1, meanwhile, has become part of Seattle's SoDo district.

Production history

The following table represents a complete list of all ships built by the Skinner & Eddy Corporation. Ships marked with an asterisk are those assigned ID numbers by the Navy but never commissioned.

Fields marked with a hyphen indicate that the given field is not applicable to this particular ship. Gross tonnage values (GRT) use the nominal GRT for the ship type (identifiable by a "00" in the last two digits) where a more precise GRT is not available for the individual ship. Consult the table legend for additional information about the table.

<small>LEGEND: Yard No. = yard number; USSB No. = USSB number; Name = name of ship. Two digit field (in superscript) following names in this column indicates last two digits of year in which ship was renamed. Names followed by a "y" (in superscript) indicate a yard name that was not subsequently used during the ship's service history. Type = type of ship, either freighter or tanker. Design No. = USSB Design number. Ships with no listed number were built prior to the introduction of the system. GRT = gross register tons. Ships for which an exact tonnage is not available are listed here with the nominal GRT of the type, usually recognizable by the last two digits being zero. Deliv. = date of ship's delivery to customer. For some ships the exact date is not known. Fate = fate of ship. Sources for this table: Pacific Ports Annual pp. 63–64, 402–405; Jordan; shipbuildinghistory.com; and various individual DANFS ship entries.</small>

 See also 
 :Category:Ships built by Skinner & Eddy
 Seattle-Tacoma Shipbuilding Corporation#Shipbuilding in Puget Sound

Footnotes

ReferencesBooks and journalsDictionary of American Naval Fighting Ships (DANFS), various entries.
Jordan, Roger H. (2006): The World's Merchant Fleets, 1939: The Particulars And Wartime Fates of 6,000 Ships, Naval Institute Press, .
McKellar, Norman L. (1963): "Steel Shipbuilding under the U.S. Shipping Board, 1917-1923", The Belgian Shiplover, Issues 87-96, May 1962-December 1963.Pacific Ports Annual, Fifth Edition, 1919, pp. 64–65, 402-405, Pacific Ports Inc.Websites"Skinner & Eddy, Seattle WA", shipbuildinghistory.com.
"General Cargo Ships Built in Pacific Coast Shipyards", shipbuildinghistory.com.
"Pier 36 -- Seattle Waterfront", historylink.org''.

Defunct shipbuilding companies of the United States
Shipbuilding in Washington (state)
Maritime history of Washington (state)
Companies based in Seattle
Defunct manufacturing companies based in Washington (state)